Rendon may refer to:
Rendon, Texas, a census-designated place in Tarrant County, Texas
Rendon Group, a public relations firm that has assisted a number of U.S. military activities
Rendon (surname)